Provis is a surname. Notable people with the surname include:

 Arthur Provis (born 1925), British cinematographer and producer
 George Provis (1908–1989), British art director
 Nicole Bradtke (née Provis) (born 1969), Australian tennis player
 Samuel Butler Provis (1845–1926), British civil servant